Reveriano Soutullo Otero (11 July 1880 in Ponteareas, Galicia – 29 October 1932 in Vigo) was a Spanish composer of zarzuelas and pasodobles. He collaborated with Juan Vert.

References

1880 births
1932 deaths
20th-century Spanish composers
20th-century Spanish male musicians
Spanish composers
Spanish male composers